Carl Gustaf Casimir Gripenberg (Kazimir Kazimirovich Grippenberg) was a Finland–Swedish naval officer who served in the Imperial Russian Navy. He was a member of the Finno-Swedish noble , and was the older brother of General Oskar Gripenberg. He was a participant in the "Third American Expedition" in 1878.

Biography

Family
The Swedish noble  was originated from the Swedish province of Östergötland, and the original family name was Witte or Wittman before being granted nobility. The first ever known member of the family was Jacob Jöransson Witte (died 1659), who was a resident in the county of Östra Eneby socken in Östergötland. His son, Johan Wittman (16371703) was a military designer in the Västerbotten Regiment, and was granted nobility and the surname of Gripenberg in 1678.

Honours and awards

Domestic
 Order of St. Anna, 3rd class (1868)
 Order of St. Stanislaus, 3rd class for "round-the-world voyage" (1869)
 Order of St. Stanislaus, 2nd class (1873)
 Order of St. Anna, 2nd class for "the highest review of the steamship" (1879)
 Order of St. Vladimir, 4th class (1882)
 Order of St. George, 4th class with a bow "in honor of 26 years of maritime campaigns" (1885)
 Order of St. Vladimir, 3rd class (1891)

References

1836 births
1908 deaths
Imperial Russian Navy admirals
People from Östergötland
Russian military personnel of the Crimean War
Russian military personnel of the Russo-Turkish War (1877–1878)
Swedish-speaking Finns
Finnish people from the Russian Empire